Acinopus laevigatus is a species of ground beetle in the subfamily Harpalinae and subgenus Acinopus (Acinopus).

References

Harpalinae
Beetles described in 1832